The Wounaan language, also known as Noanamá and Woun Meu, is a Chocoan language, with around 10,000 speakers on the border between Panama and Colombia.

Phonology 
The following tables show the vowel and consonant sounds of Wounann, transcribed using the International Phonetic Alphabet.

Vowels 

All vowels have nasalized counterparts.

Consonants

References

Choco languages
Embera-Wounaan
Indigenous languages of Central America
Indigenous languages of the South American Northwest